The Eleventh Federal Electoral District of Chiapas (XI Distrito Electoral Federal de Chiapas) is one of the 300 Electoral Districts into which Mexico is divided for the purpose of elections to the federal Chamber of Deputies and one of 12 such districts in the state of Chiapas.

It elects one deputy to the lower house of Congress for each three-year legislative period, by means of the first past the post system.

District territory
The Eleventh District of Chiapas is in the south of the state, covering a portion of the Soconusco region and the Mexico-Guatemala borderlands. It comprises the municipalities of Amatenango de la Frontera, Bejucal de Ocampo, Cacahoatán, El Porvenir, Huehuetán, Huixtla, La Grandeza, Mazapa de Madero, Mazatán, Motozintla, Siltepec, Tuzantán, Unión Juárez and the extreme north of the municipality of  Tapachula.

The district's head town (cabecera distrital), where results from individual polling stations are gathered together and collated, is the city of Huixtla.

Previous districting schemes

1996–2005 district
Between 1996 and 2005, the Eleventh  District covered only the municipalities of the southern Soconusco:
Huehuetán, Huixtla, Mazatán and Tuzantán, as at present, plus:
Acacoyagua, Acapetagua, Escuintla, Mapastepec and Villa Comaltitlán.

The Eleventh District of Chiapas was created in 1996. Between 1979 and 1996, Chiapas only had nine federal electoral districts. The Eleventh District elected its first deputy, to the 57th Congress, in 1997.

Deputies returned to Congress from this district

LVII Legislature
 1997–2000:  Arely Madrid Tovilla (PRI)
LVIII Legislature
 2000–2003:  Oscar Alvarado Cook (PRI)
LIX Legislature
 2003–2006:  César González Orantes (PRI)
LX Legislature
 2006–2009:  Anuario Luis Herrera Solís (PT)

References and notes 

Federal electoral districts of Mexico
Government of Chiapas